Communicate is the verb form of communication.

Communicate may also refer to:

 Communicate (Sasha & John Digweed album), 2000
 Communicate (The Feelers album), 2001
 Communicate (TV series), Canadian game show television series
 Communicate (magazine), monthly trade magazine for the UK corporate communications community
 Communicate!, 2004 album by The Solution

See also
 Willingness to communicate, language students willing to communicate in the second language
 Communication (disambiguation)